The boules sports tournament at the 2017 World Games in Wrocław was played between 22 and 24 July. 94 competitors, from 27 nations, participated in the tournament. The boules sports competition took place at Centennial Hall in Lower Silesian Voivodeship.

Participating nations
94 competitors, from 27 nations, participated in the tournament.

Medal table

Medalists

Men

Women

External links
 The World Games 2017
 Results Book

 
2017 World Games
Boules sports at multi-sport events